The Vermont Military Crest was first used in the coats of arms of units of Vermont state regiments, and later by the Vermont National Guard, as granted by the precursor organizations of what is now the United States Army Institute of Heraldry. The official Institute of Heraldry blazon describes the crest as follows: "A buck's head erased within a garland of pine branches all proper." The pine badge is also called a Vermonters badge, and was worn by citizens as a symbol of Vermont identity during the period of the Vermont Republic, by Vermont's military regiments at the Battle of Plattsburg, and through the U.S. Civil War. The crest is based upon the crest found on the coat of arms of Vermont. The design of the Vermont military crest is the source of the nickname for Vermont National Guard officers and enlistees, both male and female, as "Vermont Bucks."

References
 Jason Stein, Berry, and P. J. Capelotti. U.S. Army Heraldic Crests: A Complete Illustrated History of Authorized Distinctive Unit Insignia. University of South Carolina Press: 1993. .
 Jason Stein, Berry, U.S. Army Patches: An Illustrated Encyclopedia of Cloth Unit Insignia. University of South Carolina Press: 1997. .
 Zieber, Eugene, Heraldry in America: The Civic Armorial Bearings of American States. Greenwich House: 1974.

External links
Current Vermont National Guard Insignia and Crests
Vermont National Guard website

Military in Vermont
Vermont
Symbols of Vermont
Vermont National Guard